Margaret Mason (née Margaret Berry, 1975) is an American author and the creator of the website Mighty Girl. She is also the creator of three shopping blogs, Mighty Goods, Mighty Haus, and Mighty Junior, which were acquired by Staircase Ventures in 2010.

Mason is co-founder of Mighty Events, which hosts two annual conferences, Camp Mighty and Mighty Summit.

Mason is author of No One Cares What You Had for Lunch: 100 Ideas for Your Blog, and a two-time The Weblog Awards (Bloggie) nominee for lifetime achievement. She has been a speaker at the SxSW, Mom 2.0, the ALT Design Conference, and BlogHer conferences. She is a member of Intel's social media advisory board, and her work has appeared in NPR's Morning Edition Sunday, in The New York Times, Elle Magazine, Bon Appetit, The Kitchn, Twitter Wit among others

Mason lives in San Francisco with her husband, son, and daughter.

Books and publications 
 No One Cares What You Had for Lunch: 100 Ideas for Your Blog (author; Peachpit Press)
 Cringe: Teenage Diaries, Journals, Notes, Letters, Poems, and Abandoned Rock Operas (contributor)
 Things I Learned About My Dad: Humorous and Heartfelt Essays (contributor)
 Let's Pretend This Never Happened (cited)

Press 
 What Would You Say to Your 20-Year-Old Self? (NPR)
 
 Life Goal: Taste 1,000 Kinds of Fruit (The Kitchn)
 A Mighty Girl's Quest to Taste 1,000 Kinds of Fruit (Bon Appetit)
 Pro Portrait: Maggie Mason, Famous Among Dozens (Pro Portrait)

References

1975 births
Living people
American women writers
American bloggers
American women bloggers
21st-century American women